James Adam Ponsoldt (born 1978) is an American film director, actor and screenwriter. He directed the drama films Off the Black (2006) and Smashed (2012), the romantic comedy-drama The Spectacular Now (2013), and the dramas The End of the Tour (2015) and The Circle (2017).

Early life
Ponsoldt was born in Athens, Georgia. He is the son of James F. and Susan E. Ponsoldt, and the grandson of graphic artist William Teason. His father is a retired law professor, formerly at the University of Georgia. He grew up in Athens and attended Cedar Shoals High School. He received his bachelor's degree from Yale University and graduated from Columbia University with an MFA in directing. Ponsoldt is also a graduate of the Professional Programs in Screenwriting and Producing at the UCLA School of Theater, Film and Television.

Career

Short films
Ponsoldt has written and directed three short films: Coming Down the Mountain (2003), Rush Tickets (2003), and Junebug and Hurricane (2004). He also co-directed (and served as a co-directory of photography and an editor on) a documentary short called We Saw Such Things (2008), about the mermaids of Weeki Wachee Springs, Florida.

Feature films

Off the Black
Ponsoldt's first feature film that he both wrote and directed, Off the Black (2006), premiered at the Sundance Film Festival in 2006. The film stars Nick Nolte and Trevor Morgan.

Smashed
Ponsoldt's second feature film that he also both wrote and directed was Smashed (2012), which starred Mary Elizabeth Winstead and Aaron Paul. Smashed premiered at the 2012 Sundance Film Festival on January 22, 2012, and won the U.S. Dramatic Special Jury Prize for Excellence in Independent Film Producing. The film also received an Independent Spirit Award nomination for Winstead's performance.

The Spectacular Now
The Spectacular Now (2013), the third feature film Ponsoldt directed, was written by Scott Neustadter and Michael H. Weber, based on the novel by Tim Tharp. The film premiered at the 2013 Sundance Film Festival in January, 2013, where it was warmly received and was given the Special Jury Award for Acting for the performances from its two lead stars, Miles Teller and Shailene Woodley. New York-based distribution company A24 inked a deal for The Spectacular Now, which Ponsoldt shot in Athens, Georgia, in the summer of 2012. The film was released on August 2, 2013.

In The Hollywood Reporter, critic Todd McCarthy called the movie "a sincere, refreshingly unaffected look at teenagers and their attitudes about the future...Ordinary in some ways and extraordinary in others, The Spectacular Now benefits from an exceptional feel for its main characters on the parts of the director and lead actors." Cinema Blend called it "the rare Sundance coming-of-age story that feels like it matters," adding: "The Spectacular Now is an instant MVP of the first half of the festival, with potential breakout hit written all over it...you'll be hearing a lot about this one down the road, and it's got the goods to live up to the hype." Spin called the film "The next great teen movie." In Variety, critic Rob Nelson wrote: "The scars and blemishes on the faces of the high-school lovers in The Spectacular Now are beautifully emblematic of director James Ponsoldt's bid to bring the American teen movie back to some semblance of reality, a bid that pays off spectacularly indeed."

The End of the Tour
Ponsoldt's fourth feature as director is The End of the Tour (2015), with a screenplay by Donald Margulies, based on the book Although of Course You End Up Becoming Yourself (2010) by David Lipsky. It follows Rolling Stone writer David Lipsky (Jesse Eisenberg) as he interviews author David Foster Wallace (Jason Segel) during the final week of the promotional book tour for Infinite Jest. The film also stars Anna Chlumsky and Ron Livingston. It premiered at The Sundance Film Festival in January 2015 and was released theatrically in July 2015.

The Circle
Ponsoldt's fifth feature film is an adaption of Dave Eggers' novel The Circle, about an omnipotent high-tech company known as "The Circle". Emma Watson, Tom Hanks, Karen Gillan, and John Boyega star in the film, which was released on April 28, 2017. Ponsoldt co-produced the film.

Summering 
In August 2021, Bleecker Street and Stage 6 Films picked up the worldwide rights to James Ponsoldt’s coming of age film Summering, starring Sarah Cooper alongside Megan Mullally.

TV
Ponsoldt has also directed an episode of Parenthood entitled "The M Word" (2013), an episode of Shameless entitled "Iron City" (2014), and two episodes (including the pilot) of the Aziz Ansari series Master of None. He also directed and executive produced four episodes of the first season of the Facebook Watch original Sorry for Your Loss, including the pilot and the season finale. Ponsoldt executive produced and directed multiple episodes of the Amazon series Daisy Jones & The Six, as well as the Apple series Shrinking.

Future projects
It was announced in May 2015 that Ponsoldt was in negotiations to write and direct an adaptation of the Stewart O'Nan novel, West of Sunset, which follows writer F. Scott Fitzgerald as he comes to Hollywood to try his hand at screenwriting in 1937, when his health was poor, his finances were dismal, and his wife was in an insane asylum.

Producing
In addition to producing or serving as an executive producer on films that he both wrote and directed, Ponsoldt was an associate producer on the TV movie Porn 'n Chicken (2002), served as an executive producer on the feature film Amira & Sam (2014), directed and written by Sean Mullin, and also served as an executive producer on the short film Mountain Low (2014), written and directed by Andy Bruntel.

Filmography

Feature films

Short narrative films
Coming Down the Mountain (2003), director, writer
Rush Tickets (2003), director, writer, producer
Junebug and Hurricane (2004), director, writer, producer

Documentary films
We Saw Such Things (2008) (documentary short), co-director, co-writer, co-producer, co-editor, co-director of photography

Television

References

External links
 

1978 births
Living people
American male film actors
American male screenwriters
Columbia University School of the Arts alumni
Writers from Athens, Georgia
Yale University alumni
Film directors from Georgia (U.S. state)
Screenwriters from Georgia (U.S. state)